Betchat is a commune in the Ariège department of southwestern France.

Population
Inhabitants of Betchat are called Betchatois.

See also
Communes of the Ariège department

References

Communes of Ariège (department)
Ariège communes articles needing translation from French Wikipedia